Lyonetia bakuchia is a moth in the Lyonetiidae family. It is known from Japan (Kyushu, Yakushima).

The wingspan is 7-7.5 mm. Adults are on wing from the end of October to the end of November.

The larvae feed on Prunus zippeliana. They mine the leaves of their host plant. The mine is linear, upper surface and yellowish-brown to pale greenish-brown. The blackish-brown frass is deposited in a rather broad central line; The mine is usually found on a young leaf. It starts near the margin of the leaf and extends in an irregular serpentine or tortuous gallery. Larvae may migrate from one leaf to another. Full-grown larvae split the upper epidermis of the leaf to leave the mine.

External links
Revisional Studies on the Family Lyonetiidae of Japan (Lepidoptera)
Japanese Moths

Lyonetiidae
Moths of Japan